A rabaska or Maître canoe (after Louis Maitre, an artisan from Trois-Rivières who made them) was originally a large canoe made of tree bark, used by the Algonquin people.

Rabaskas were used by French and Canadian explorers to access the interior of North America during the 17th and 18th centuries, and by travellers and traders until the end of the 19th century. Throughout this time they were key in spreading French settlers throughout North America, adapting to their new continent and developing contact with indigenous populations.

Etymology
The word rabaska is a Canadianism from New France. It is derived from athapaskaw, a word common to Algonquin and Cree. This word designates the Athabasca River and its original meaning is "grass and reeds here and there".

Specifications

For sport and leisure, a typical crew consists of twelve rowers in six banks and a cox at the stern.

A rabaska is prized for its speed and robustness, but it has a large draught. In shallow waters it is liable to grounding. To prevent damage, the bow rowers must quickly jump into the water and dislodge the craft.

Past use

People of the First Nations used rabaskas for travel, commerce and finding new, viable sites to raise their families. Rabaskas were the vessel of choice for fur traders, because of their large cargo capacity. They also supplied the farthest outposts of the fur trade. Each spring, rabaska canoes by the dozen  with experienced crews would undertake the long voyage from Lachine (near Montreal) to the Pays d'en Haut, seeking out precious furs. They would not return until autumn. The rabaska's robustness enabled exploration – and exploitation – of distant territories which were inaccessible by other means of transport. Some crews hired singers to keep stroke and increase productivity.

Present use

Today, rabaskas are an outdoor leisure pursuit. The large crew and the stability of the craft allow time for breaks and sightseeing.

See also
Canadian canoe

References

Canoeing in Canada
Canoes
First Nations culture
Indigenous boats
Fur trade